William Joseph Bradley (February 13, 1878 – March 11, 1954) was a third baseman and manager in Major League Baseball. He recognized as one of the best third basemen in baseball prior to 1950, along with Jimmy Collins and Pie Traynor.

Career

Bradley made his professional debut on August 26, 1899 with the Chicago Orphans. After playing for two seasons in Chicago, Bradley moved to Cleveland to play for the newly formed American League. He spent the next decade with the Cleveland franchise, his best season coming in 1902 when he had a batting average of .340, 12 triples, and 11 home runs. After the 1910 season, Bradley spent three seasons with the Toronto Maple Leafs of the International League before returning to the Federal League in 1914, playing for the Brooklyn Tip-Tops that year and the Kansas City Packers the following year.

He led American League third basemen in fielding four times, setting a league record of seven putouts in one game in both 1901 and 1909. Bill Bradley was the first Cleveland baseball player to hit for the cycle on September 24, 1903. In  he hit home runs in four straight games and finished the year with a .340 batting average.

After finishing his playing and managing career in the Federal League, Bill Bradley was a scout for the Cleveland Indians. He was elected to the Indians' Hall of Fame shortly after his death in 1954. Bradley died in Cleveland at the age of 76 due to pneumonia.  He was laid to rest at Calvary Cemetery in Cleveland, Ohio.

See also
 List of Major League Baseball career stolen bases leaders
 List of Major League Baseball player-managers
 List of Major League Baseball players to hit for the cycle

References

Further reading
Bill Bradley - Baseballbiography.com

External links

, or Retrosheet

1878 births
1954 deaths
Baseball players from Cleveland
Major League Baseball third basemen
Major League Baseball player-managers
Chicago Orphans players
Cleveland Blues (1901) players
Cleveland Bronchos players
Cleveland Naps players
Cleveland Naps managers
Cleveland Indians scouts
Kansas City Packers players
Brooklyn Tip-Tops players
Brooklyn Tip-Tops managers
Minor league baseball managers
Burlington Colts players
Auburn Maroons players
Troy Trojans (minor league) players
Toronto Maple Leafs (International League) players
19th-century baseball players
Baseball coaches from Ohio